Nassarius kraussianus, common name the tick shell, is a species of sea snail, a marine gastropod mollusk in the family Nassariidae, the Nassa mud snails or dog whelks.

Description
The size of the shell varies from 6 mm to 10 mm.

Distribution
This species occurs in the Indian Ocean off Mozambique, South Africa and Réunion and in the Atlantic Ocean off Namibia.

References

 Cernohorsky W. O. (1984). Systematics of the family Nassariidae (Mollusca: Gastropoda). Bulletin of the Auckland Institute and Museum 14: 1–356.
 Branch, G.M. et al. (2002). Two Oceans. 5th impression. David Philip, Cate Town & Johannesburg
 MacNae, W. & M. Kalk (eds) (1958). A natural history of Inhaca Island, Mozambique. Witwatersrand Univ. Press, Johannesburg. I-iv, 163 pp

External links
 

Nassariidae
Gastropods described in 1846